Sivry-sur-Meuse (literally Sivry on Meuse) is a commune in the Meuse department in Grand Est in north-eastern France. 
Sivry-sur-Meuse was invaded in World War 1. Most of the houses were damaged in the Battle of Verdun.

See also
Communes of the Meuse department

References

Sivrysurmeuse